Edward R. Tallon, Sr. (born September 30, 1944) is an American politician. He is a former member of the South Carolina House of Representatives from the 33rd District, serving from 2011 to 2020. He is a member of the Republican party.

In 2019, Tallon proposed to bring back the electric chair as the default method for killing death row inmates.

References

Living people
1944 births
Republican Party members of the South Carolina House of Representatives
21st-century American politicians